Yahoo! Public License is a free software license by Yahoo!. It is used among others by old versions of the collaborative software Zimbra. It is approved by the Free Software Foundation as a free (however GPL-incompatible) software license.

References

Free and open-source software licenses
Copyleft software licenses

de:Zimbra#Editionen